Eri Yamaguchi may refer to:

, Japanese cricketer
, Japanese long-distance runner